The Cinema Express Award for Best Director – Tamil is given as a part of its annual Cinema Express Awards for Tamil (Kollywood) films.

Winners

References 

Awards for best director
Cinema Express Awards